This article lists important dates in rail transport.

2009

January events 
  January 1 – Oscar Grant III is shot by BART Police Officer Johannes Mehserle on a busy Bay Area Rapid Transit platform. See: Shooting of Oscar Grant
  January 12 – official opening of Docklands Light Railway London City Airport branch extension under the River Thames to Woolwich Arsenal.
  January 23 – Canadian National Railway closes on purchase of Elgin, Joliet and Eastern Railway.

February events 
  February 2 – opening of WES Commuter Rail line from Wilsonville, Oregon, to Beaverton; see https://trimet.org for more information.
   February 17 – The international connection between Perpignan, Roussillon, France, and Figueres, Catalonia, Spain, through the Perthus Tunnel on the Perpignan–Barcelona high-speed rail line is officially opened.
  February 28 – opening of East West MRT Line extension of additional two stations from Boon Lay. Trains by this date no longer terminate at Boon Lay Station.

March events 
  March – first section of Istanbul-Ankara High Speed Rail Line, between Ankara and Eskişehir, opens.
   – the Thai–Lao Friendship Bridge is officially opened to rail traffic.
  March 16 – reopening of New York City's South Ferry Station after four years of renovation.
  March 20 – Hanshin Namba Line, Amagasaki-Namba route to open, with Hanshin Sannomiya-Kintetsu Nara direct commuter express train starting.
  March 31 – the deadline for securing financing for the Amman-Zarqa Light Rail System by the Kuwaiti-led consortium passed, effectively voiding the projects after more than 10 years in planning. The deadline had already been extended twice before.

April events

May events 
  May – Russian Railways introduces hybrid DT1 multiple unit into service out of Baltiysky railway station in Saint Petersburg.
  May 1 – Pan Am Southern, a joint venture between Pan Am Railways and Norfolk Southern Railway, begins operation.
  May 28 – Singapore Circle MRT Line Stage 3 ready for service using three-car Alstom trains.

June events

July events 
  July 18 – Sound Transit Central Link light rail line in Seattle, Washington opens, utilizing the Downtown Seattle Transit Tunnel.
  – link between Kerman and Zahedan joins Europe and the Middle East subcontinent for the first time, albeit with break-of-gauge.

August events 
  August 16 – Kowloon Southern Link, an extension of the KCRC West Rail Line in Hong Kong, completed and opened.
  August 17 – opening of Canada Line rapid transit line in Vancouver, British Columbia.
  August 30 – new Portland Transit Mall light-rail alignment opens for service, initially (until September 12) used only by the MAX Yellow Line.

September events 

  September 9 – partial opening of Dubai Metro.
  September 12 – MAX Green Line light rail line in Portland, Oregon, opens, transporting riders from Portland State University to Clackamas Town Center Transit Center.
  September 20 – the Powerhouse Museum's 3265 is recommissioned with a ceremony at Central station and shuttle rides with the locomotive to Bankstown.

October events

November events 
  November 13 – as announced on July 1, the British InterCity East Coast Main Line passenger rail franchise is transferred at 23:59 from National Express East Coast to the Department for Transport-owned company Directly Operated Railways Ltd for operation by its subsidiary East Coast Main Line Company Ltd, trading as East Coast, prior to retendering from late 2010.
  November 16 – the section from Stavanger to Sandnes on the Sørland Line opens with double track.
  November 27 – 2009 Nevsky Express bombing: A terrorist bomb explodes under a high-speed train on the Moscow–Saint Petersburg Railway, derailing it, killing 28 passengers and injuring more than 90 others.
  November 30 – Metro Trains Melbourne (subsidiary of MTR Corporation of Hong Kong) takes over operation of suburban rail network in Melbourne, Australia, from Connex.

December events 
  December – construction to restore the mainline of the Virginia and Truckee Railroad from Gold Hill to Carson City, Nevada completed.
  December 1 – Tasmanian government-owned Tasmanian Railway Company takes over operations on the island from Pacific National.
  December 9 – services on the London Underground Circle line cease to run continuous complete circuits, for the first time since 1884.
  December 13 – The first Thalys train goes into commercial operation on the HSL-Zuid, marking the first time a high-speed train runs through the Netherlands on full speed at 300km/h.
  December 13 – start of domestic services on High Speed 1, the UK's first high speed services run by Southeastern, from Dover Priory to London St Pancras, via Ashford International. The British Rail Class 395 trains are part of the "Javelin" service provided during the London 2012 Olympics
 December 18 – Sapsan, a high-speed railroad service in Russia, a first officially regular operation service start from Passazhirskaya of Moscow to Sankt Petersburg route.
  December 26 – Wuguang Passenger Railway high speed line between Wuhan and Guangzhou, China, opens.
  December 28 – Guangzhou Metro's Line 4 extension connecting Wanshengwei to Chebeinan opens.
  December 31 – Chicago Transit Authority's Brown Line capacity expansion project completed.

2020

February 
  – Construction begins in the Republic of the Congo on a planned  of new railway lines connecting Brazzaville to Ouésso and Djambala to Pointe-Noire.

Accidents 
  June 22 – Washington Metro accident occurs when two afternoon southbound Metrorail trains on the Red Line are in a rear-end collision between the Takoma and Fort Totten stations in Northeast Washington, D.C., United States, killing eight passengers and the operator of the rear train, trapping several occupants, and injuring up to 100 more.  The most serious accident in the Metro's history.
  August 21 – span of Iarnród Éireann's Broadmeadow viaduct, carrying the main line to Belfast about 13 km north of Dublin and just north of Malahide, collapses due to scour.
  November 16th - Unit 29026 was derailed near Wicklow when it collided with a landslip blocking the line.

Industry awards

Japan 
 Awards presented by the Japan Railfan Club
 2009 Blue Ribbon Award: Odakyu Electric Railway 60000 series MSE EMU 
 2009 Laurel Prize: Toyohashi Railroad T1000 series tramcar and Keihan Electric Railway 3000 series "Comfort Saloon" EMU

North America 
2009 E. H. Harriman Awards

Awards presented by Railway Age magazine
 2009 Railroader of the Year:
 2009 Regional Railroad of the Year: Wisconsin and Southern Railroad
 2009 Short Line Railroad of the Year:

United Kingdom 
Train Operator of the Year

Deaths related to rail transport 
 January 10, 2009 – Jean Pelletier, chairman of VIA Rail 2001–2004, dies (b. 1935).
 February 20, 2009 – James I. C. Boyd, British railway historian, dies (b. 1921).

References